Arthur Erskine Ellis (1 October 1902 – 28 February 1983), often known as A.E. Ellis, was a British scientist, biologist and naturalist. Ellis is best known for his large number of malacological publications, including some which became essential texts on the subject of British non-marine malacology. To a lesser extent, Ellis published papers about other land invertebrates and various aspects of the fauna and flora of Britain. In addition Ellis had five ghost stories published.

Ellis was also a plant collector. From 1919 to 1961 he contributed specimens of spermatophytes to a number of different herbariums in Britain.

Stella Turk, the British naturalist said about Ellis, "It is difficult to categorise people. Should one even try? We are all multiple in a singular way!"; she also commented, "As might have been expected, he wrote his own obituary in which he gives a broad outline of his life and very lengthy bibliography", (J. Conch. 31 1983).

Taxa named in his honour
Two taxa were named in Ellis' honour:
 Limicolariopsis ellisi Crowley & Pain, 1964 (Rev. Zool. Bot, Afr. 69: 191) -- a large African land snail
 Pisidium (Afropisidium) ellisi Dance, 1967 (J. Conch. 26: 178) -- a small freshwater clam

Publications

Books
A.E. Ellis published several books which were the standard reference texts for identifying the non-marine Mollusca of Great Britain and Ireland during most of the 20th century:
 British Snails, a guide to the non-marine Gastropoda of Great Britain and Ireland, Pleistocene to Recent, 1926, reprinted in 1969, Oxford University Press
 Key to Land Shells of Great Britain
 British Freshwater Bivalve Mollusca (Synopses of the British fauna; new series, number 11)

Papers
Publications on non-marine mollusca and obituaries of conchologists:
JC = Journal of Conchology. PMS = Proceedings of the Malacological Society (London)
1924	Mollusca of Flamborough. JC 17: 149–153
1924	Notes on some British Helicidae, JC 17: 162–167
1924	Land Mollusca on the Mewstone, JC 17: 187–188
1924	Mollusca in the neighbourhood of Market Harborough, JC 17: 188–192, 212–219; 18:8
1925	Experimental acclimatisation of Sabinea ulvae (Pennant) to freshwater,  Ann. & Mag. Nat. Hist. 15: 96–7
1925	The invalidity of Sabinea Sowerby. ibid. 16: 48–49
1926	Planorbis (Gyraulus) acronicus Férussac at Oxford. JC 18: 52–53
1926	British Snails. Clarendon Press (2nd edition, 1969).
1926	Helix draparnaudi Sheppard, and Planorbis draparnaldi Jeffreys. JC 18: 54
1926	Notes on some land Molluscs from Land's End. PMS 17: 123–6
1927	Variation in Trichia liberta (Westerlund).JC 18: 118
1927	Additional notes on the Molluscs of the Oxford district. JC 18: 137–8
1927	An abnormality in Lymnaea stagnalis (Linn.).JC 18: 139
1927	The snail as a zoological type, School Science Review No. 34: 102–110
1928	Vertigo moulinsiana (Dupuy) near Norwich. JC 18: 208
1928	Planorbis vorticulus Troschel in West Sussex. PMS 18: 127
1929	A garden fauna. JC 18: 312
1930	Mollusca on Gateholm. JC 19: 61
1931	A reclaimed saltmarsh. PMS 19: 278–9
1931	Molluscs of Wicken Fen [note]. JC 19: 170
1931	Notes on some Norfolk Molluscs. JC 19: 177–8
1931	(with D. Aubertin & G. C. Robson) The natural history and variation of the Pointed Snail, Cochlicella acuta (Müll.). Proc. Zool. Soc. Lond. for 1930: 1027–1055, pl. 1
1932	The habitats of Hydrobiidae in the Adur estuary. PMS 20: 11–18
1932	Further localities for Planorbis vorticulus Troschel. JC 19: 258–9
1939	A Surrey Bronze Age interment. JC 21: 90
1939	A discussion on the variation of Lymnaea, etc. PMS 23: 313
1940	The identification of the British species of Pisidium. PMS 24: 44–88, pl. 3–6
1940	Some Devon land snails. JC 21: 190
1941	The Mollusca of a Norfolk broad (presidential address). JC 21: 224–243
1941	Ecological notes. JC 21: 258–9
1941	Anodonta minima Millet in Norfolk. JC 21: 280
1942	Milax gracilis (Leydig) in woodland. JC 21: 325–6
1945	Limax flavus L. in a 'wild' habitat. JC 22: 135
1946	Milax sowerbyi (Fér.) in woodland. JC 22: 177
1946	On Potomida Swainson. PMS 27: 105–8, pl. 7
1946	Freshwater bivalves (Mollusca). Corbicula, Sphaerium, Dreissena. Linn. Soc. Synopses of the British Fauna, No. 4
1947	Freshwater bivalves (Mollusca): Unionacea. ibid. No. 5
1947	Retinella nitidula (Drap.) monstr. sinistrorsum. JC 22: 271
1947	Dimensions of Anodonta minima Millet. JC 22: 271
1948	The survey of Bookham Common. Land Mollusca of Bookham Common. London Naturalist for 1947: 56–59
1949	A Broadland slug [Agriolimax agrestis L.] Transactions of the Norfolk & Norwich Nature Society. 16: 388
1950	Succinea putris (L.) parasitized by Leucochloridium. JC 23: 107
1950	The type species of Testacella. JC 23: 115
1951	R. Winckworth, obituary. JC 23: 157–62
1954	Volvulus Oken. JC 23: 394
1959	E. W. Swanton, obituary. JC 24: 326
1961	Land and freshwater Mollusca in Norwich and its region, p. 73. British Association. Jarrold, Norwich
1961	H. H. Bloomer, obituary. Proc. Linn. Soc. Lond. 172nd session: part 1.
1962	British freshwater bivalve Molluscs. Linn. Soc. Synopses of British fauna, No. 13
1964	L. W. Grensted, obituary. JC 25: 291–3, pl. 20
1964	Arion lusitanicus Mabille in Cornwall. JC 25: 285–287
1964	Milax budapestensis (Hazay) in woodland. JC 25: 298
1965	Arion lusitanicus Mabille in Devon. JC 25: 345–347
1967	Agriolimax agrestis (L.): some observations. JC 25: 345–7
1978	British freshwater bivalve Molluscs, Linn. Soc. Synopses of British Fauna (New Series) No. 11

Conchological Society; Papers for Students
No. 3 (1964). Key to land shells of Great Britain. 
No. 3 (2nd edition, 1974). Key to the land snails of the British Isles.
No. 12 (1969). Key to British slugs

Publications in the Conchologists' Newsletter:
1961	Land and freshwater snails, additions to the British list, 3:12–13
1962	Biographical note, 4:16
1964	Some etymology, 9:50–51
1964	Sinistrosity, 9:53–54
1964	Snails extinct in England, but living abroad, 11:68–69
1964	Posting living molluscs, 11:68–69
1966	(with Stella Turk), Cornish localities for Arion lusitanicus 16:108
1967	Conkers and conchology, 20:138–139
1967	Nesovitrea hammonis and N. petronella, 21:6
1967	Unorthodox orthography, 22:15–16
1967	Poems on Conchology, 22:24–25
1968	Arion lusitanicus in Ireland, 25:40–41
1968	Metamerism, 25:47
1968	Pronunciation, 27:65–66
1969	Snail-eating dragons, 31:13 122
1970	Slugs and the poets, 35:185–186
1971	Names of British marine molluscs, 37:205–206
1971	Slugs and the poets, 39:233–234
1972	Blueprint for peace, 43:289
1972	Such numbers of snails, 43:289
1973	Who is Brittannia? What is She? 4.44:302
1973	Perils of the deep, 44:310
1973	Footnote to, Who is Britannia, 44:313
1973	An Old English Riddle, 45:316–317
1973	Hooper's hypothesis, 45:323
1973	Biographical and historical footnotes, 45:323
1973	Cochlea liberum, the snail in old nursery rhymes, 47:346–348
1974	Paradise lost? 49:373
1974	First record of Arion lusitanicus in Ireland, 49:384
1974	Review, From the diary of a snail, Günter Grass, 50:393–394
1974	First record of Arion lusitanicus in Ireland, 50:395
1974	Excelsior: the snail ascending, 51:398–399
1975	Place names with a molluscan flavour, 52:412–414
1975	Why collect shells? 53:434–435
1975	Pestalozzian conchology, a note, 54:449–450
1975	Shells as musical instruments, 55:460–461
1975	The snail in 19th century verse, 55:464–466
1975	Pestalozzian conchology, 55:469
1976	L'escargot, 58:519-520
1976	Molluscan place names: supplement, 58:520–521
1976	Correction to an Old English Riddle, 58:521
1977	Shells murmurs, 71:189-190. 62:33–34
1977	The mollusc in fables, 63:44–46
1978	Shakespeare and sea shells, 67:105–106
1979	Adventure of a snail hunter, 69:153–154
1979	Poem on the limpet, 71:182–183
1979	Snails and slugs in Shakespeare, 71:189–190
1981	Cassel's Natural History, 76:309–310.
1982	Celebrities in shells, 81:9
1982	Concerning Captain Thomas Brown, 82:35–36
1982	Sue Wells, international trade in ornamental shells, 83:56

References

1902 births
Alumni of the University of Oxford
British zoologists
British malacologists
Scientists from Bangalore
Fellows of the Linnean Society of London
1983 deaths
New Naturalist writers
20th-century Indian zoologists
British people in colonial India